Aiyana is a given name.  It is often claimed to be a Native American name, meaning "blossoming" or "eternal flower".

In the United States, the name Aiyana was most popular in 2003, when it was given to 846 newborn girls.  The name was on the top 1000 chart every year from 1992 to 2014.

References 

Feminine given names